Tallgrass Prairie National Preserve is a United States National Preserve located in the Flint Hills region of Kansas, north of Strong City. The preserve protects a nationally significant example of the once vast tallgrass prairie ecosystem. Since 2009, the preserve has been home to the Tallgrass Prairie bison herd.

Description
The NPS and The Nature Conservancy work toward preservation of the tallgrass prairie, while sharing the story of ranching legacy, American Indian history, and the diverse tallgrass prairie ecosystem in the heart of the scenic Flint Hills of Kansas.

During the summer, narrated bus tours of the prairie are offered.

On January 29, 2008, Tallgrass Prairie National Preserve was named as one of the 8 Wonders of Kansas by the Kansas Sampler Foundation.

Ranch history
Development of Spring Hill Ranch began in 1878, with land purchases in the Flint Hills by Stephen F. Jones, a cattle rancher originally from Tennessee. He completed the ranch headquarters in 1881, and was one of the early adopters in the region of enclosed ranching, in which cattle movements are limited by stone walls, fences, or barbed wire. This was a marked change that swept across the Plains in the 1880s, caused in large part by overgrazing in open range operations. The Second Empire style ranch house was built for Jones in 1881 at an estimated cost of $25,000. Jones was also responsible for construction of the Lower Fox Creek School, built on land he donated. Jones used the ranch to grow herds of purebred cattle of several breeds, as well as some purebred breeds of hogs and sheep. Jones sold the ranch in 1888 to Barney Lantry.

The Lantry family kept the ranch until 1904, primarily raising thoroughbred cattle. Spring Hill, the core of their holdings, was eventually divided up into smaller parcels. It was reassembled in a series of purchases executed in 1935 by George Davis, a grain dealer from Kansas City. Following Davis's death in 1955, the property was eventually put into a trust, and operated as the Z-Bar Ranch.

Historic interest in the property began in the 1960s, when local groups organized the restoration of the Lower Fox Creek School. The ranch complex was listed on the National Register of Historic Places in 1971, one of the first listings in the state. The National Audubon Society acquired an option to purchase the property in 1988, but this expired in 1990. It aroused wider interest in the property, resulting in its eventual acquisition by the National Park Trust. The entire ranch property was designated a National Historic Landmark District in 1997, primarily for its association with Jones and the end of the open range ranching era.

The  Spring Hill/Z-Bar Ranch was purchased by the National Park Trust in 1994. Legislation introduced in 1991 called for the creation of the Preserve, but local interests objected to the condition that the National Park Service would own it all. U.S. Senator Nancy Kassebaum convened a group of stakeholders to seek agreement on the formula for a tallgrass prairie park. The group began work in January 1992, and a different model for a national park emerged; it would be a public/private partnership, managed by the National Park Service, but the land privately owned.

Preserve history 
In 1994, Senators Kassebaum and Bob Dole introduced Senate bill S. 2412 in Congress, which would allow the Federal government to create a national preserve under the public/private partnership ownership arrangement. On November 12, 1996, the bill became , later codified under 16 USC 698.

National Park Trust worked with the National Park Service to plan and develop the park from 1996 to 2005.

Though National Park Trust was named in the legislation, the law allowed for successor non-profits to own the land and continue the unique public/private ownership and management relationship. So, in 2005, National Park Trust sold the approximate  to The Nature Conservancy. Additionally Texas billionaire Ed Bass, owns grazing rights to nearly  until 2035 and whose cattle dot much of the hills and valleys of the preserve.

Management 
The National Park Service and The Nature Conservancy established a bison herd with 13 animals in 2009 from Wind Cave National Park. The population of 90 bison not only represent a vital component for the tallgrass prairie ecosystem, but also help preserve the genetic integrity in the conservation of American bison. Typically a third of the prairie grasslands is burned each year.

See also
 List of protected grasslands of North America
 List of National Historic Landmarks in Kansas

References

External links

 Tallgrass Prairie National Preserve – National Park Service
 Tallgrass Prairie National Preserve – The Nature Conservancy
 Tallgrass Prairie National Preserve – National Park Trust

Grasslands of the North American Great Plains
National Preserves of the United States
Nature reserves in Kansas
Protected areas of Chase County, Kansas
Prairies
Recreational areas in Kansas
Landforms of Kansas
Protected areas established in 1996
1996 establishments in Kansas
Nature Conservancy preserves
National Park Service areas in Kansas
Grasslands of Kansas
National Historic Landmarks in Kansas
National Register of Historic Places in Chase County, Kansas
Historic districts in Kansas